USCGC General Greene (WPC/WSC/WMEC-140), was a  United States Coast Guard , in commission from 1927 to 1968 and the fourth cutter to bear the name of the famous Revolutionary War general, Nathanael Greene. She served during the Rum Patrol, World War II and into the 1960s performing defense, law enforcement, ice patrol, and search and rescue missions.

Construction and commissioning
The General Greene was built by the American Brown Boveri Electric Corp. of Camden, New Jersey, at a cost of $90,000. She was launched on 14 February 1927, and commissioned on 7 April 1927.

Patrol duties during the Depression

General Greene had been designed specifically for prohibition enforcement service and assumed Rum Patrol duty 15 May 1927 with a home-port of Boston, Massachusetts Her routine consisted of picketing liquor laden "mother ships" and preventing them from offloading prohibited cargo to smaller contact boats that were used to deliver liquor to shore. On 15 March 1931 she departed Boston bound for St. Johns, Newfoundland to join the International Ice Patrol for the first time. At the end of the patrol season she would return to Boston and resume Rum Patrol duties; this pattern would continue through the end of the 1933 Ice Patrol season. With the end of prohibition in 1933, General Greene assumed a more traditional role of a Coast Guard cutter, that of search and rescue, law enforcement, merchant vessel inspection, and defense training. In 1941 she conducted an oceanographic survey off the coast of Newfoundland and while on the survey in May 1941, she was ordered to search for survivors from two British freighters torpedoed off the coast of Greenland.

World War II service
In early 1942 she was re-designated WSC-140, and assigned to search and rescue and convoy escort duties. On 25 May 1942 she engaged a German U-boat with depth charges in a dense fog off Nantucket Shoals while rescuing survivors from the British freighter SS Peisander.

Post-war service
In 1946 she returned to her station at Woods Hole, and from 1947 until her decommissioning in 1968 was based at Gloucester, Massachusetts.

While attempting to assist a tug in distress, General Greene was swept ashore on Spring Hill Beach at East Sandwich, Massachusetts, by hurricane-force winds and  waves on 4 March 1960. All hands were rescued and the ship was refloated on 8 March 1960.

After her decommissioning, General Greene was transferred to Newburyport, Massachusetts, for use as a museum ship, but she was returned to the Coast Guard in 1976 and sold. In 1979, renamed Belmont and under the flag of Guatemala, she was seized by the Coast Guard for drug smuggling.

Awards
American Defense Service Medal with "A" device
American Campaign Medal
World War II Victory Medal
National Defense Service Medal with star

See also
Rum Patrol

Notes

Citations

References

Websites
 
 

Active-class patrol boats
1927 ships
Ships built in Camden, New Jersey
World War II patrol vessels of the United States
Maritime incidents in 1960
Shipwrecks of the Massachusetts coast
Brown, Boveri & Cie